U of V may refer to:

 University of Victoria, a university in Canada
 University of Vermont, a university in the United States
 University of Virginia, a university in the United States

See also
 UV (disambiguation)